The 1932 Santa Barbara State Roadrunners football team represented Santa Barbara State during the 1932 college football season.

Santa Barbara State competed in the Southern California Intercollegiate Athletic Conference (SCIAC). The Roadrunners were led by fifth-year head coach Harold Davis and played home games at Peabody Stadium in Santa Barbara, California. They finished the season with a record of one win and six losses (1–6, 1–6 SCIAC). Overall, the team was outscored by its opponents 12–151 for the season. The Roadrunners were shutout five times, and failed to score more than a touchdown in all seven games.

Schedule

Notes

References

Santa Barbara State
UC Santa Barbara Gauchos football seasons
Santa Barbara State Roadrunners football